Newtown, Eliogarty (Holycross) (Irish: An Baile Nua) is a townland in the Barony of Eliogarty in County Tipperary, Ireland. It is in the civil parish of Holycross.
It is one of nineteen townlands known as Newtown in County Tipperary.

References

Townlands of County Tipperary